That Man Bolt is a 1973 American action film directed by David Lowell Rich and Henry Levin. It stars Fred Williamson in the title role of a courier and Byron Webster. The film combined several genres: blaxploitation, the martial arts film, and James Bond superspy films (with some postures featuring the tagline "He's Bonded"). It was filmed in Hong Kong, Macau and the United States and featured several martial arts experts in action: Mike Stone, World Professional Light Heavyweight Karate Champion, Kenji Kazama Japan Kickboxing Champion, Emil Farkas, European Black Belt Karate Champion, and David Chow, Former California State Judo Champion. It was titled Operation Hong Kong outside the United States. Peter Crowcroft wrote the novelization of the screenplay.

Plot
Courier Jefferson Bolt is asked to take a briefcase from Hong Kong to Mexico City, but he is not told what is in it or the identity of the man who asks him, a man named Griffiths. Convinced he will get good pay and see a few good places, Bolt takes on the job, while looking out for anything suspicious. Soon he does find exotic places, beautiful women, and ruthless gunmen interested in the briefcase.

Production
Fred Williamson recalled that Universal Pictures signed him for three films featuring the Bolt character as a black James Bond, but avoiding the urban locations of blaxploitation films.  One director was replaced to make the film look more like a globetrotting secret agent film rather than a made for television movie. Williamson felt that Universal was not prepared to launch a film series featuring a black star.  Though no other Bolt films were made, Williamson was paid for two films.

Cast
 Fred Williamson as Jefferson Bolt
 Byron Webster as Griffiths
 Miko Mayama as Dominique Kuan
 Teresa Graves as Samantha Nightingale
 Masatoshi Nakamura as Kumada
 John Orchard as Carter  
 Jack Ging as Connie Mellis  
 Ken Kazama as "Spider" 
 Vassili Lambrinos as Raoul De Vargas  
 Paul Mantee as Mickey

Filming locations
Hong Kong, UK (today China)
Las Vegas, Nevada, USA
Los Angeles International Airport, Los Angeles, California, USA
Los Angeles, California, USA
Macau, Portugal (today China)

See also
 List of American films of 1973

References

External links

1973 films
American crime thriller films
Blaxploitation films
Films directed by David Lowell Rich
Films directed by Henry Levin
Films scored by Charles Bernstein
Films with screenplays by Ranald MacDougall
Films set in Hong Kong
Universal Pictures films
1970s English-language films
1970s American films